Timothy P. Probst is an American politician of the Democratic Party. He is a former member of the Washington House of Representatives, where he  represented the 17th district from 2009 to 2013.

Tim has published a book "Joe Lake Journal - A Trail Guide to a Better America After the Coronavirus", May 11, 2020, .

References

Living people
Year of birth missing (living people)
Democratic Party members of the Washington House of Representatives